Galina Batrazovna Gabisova (formerly Mekhdieva; born 17 June 1985), from 2015 until 2020 Galina Mekhdieva named, is a Russian handball goalkeeper for Rostov-Don and the Russian national team.

She represented Russia at the 2020 European Women's Handball Championship.

International honours 
Russian Super League:
Winners: 2015, 2017, 2018, 2019
Russian Cup:
Winners: 2007, 2008, 2012, 2013, 2015, 2016, 2017, 2018, 2019
EHF Champions League:
Finalist: 2018/2019
Fourth place: 2017/2018
Women's EHF Cup:
Winners: 2017
Runners-up: 2015

References

External links

1985 births
Living people
Sportspeople from Rostov-on-Don
Russian female handball players